The Barlavento Islands (Portuguese: Ilhas de Barlavento, literally, the Windward Islands) is the northern group of the Cape Verde archipelago. It presents as two sub-groups: 
in the west: Santo Antão, São Vicente, São Nicolau, Santa Luzia and islets Branco and Raso are volcanic and somewhat rocky yet quite widely capable of supporting semi-arid agriculture.
in the east: Sal and Boa Vista are lightly-hilled, desert islands whose economies were based on salt and rely on fishing and tourism, having more in common with the Sotavento island Maio.

Spanning from longitude -22.67 to -25.36 (implying west of the Prime Meridian), the group sits in the Trade winds, specifically at the optional southern turn or tack termed by European sailors a key point of the Volta do Mar. The islands are west of Cap-Vert at -17.31 west, in turn the westernmost point of Africa on the outskirts of Dakar (the capital of Senegal).



See also
 List of islands of Cape Verde
 Sotavento Islands

Notes

References

Further reading

 Barlavento Islands article at Britannica Online, accessed on 1 January 2010